Intermec is a manufacturer and supplier of automated identification and data capture equipment, including barcode scanners, barcode printers, mobile computers, RFID systems, voice recognition systems, and life cycle services.

Intermec holds patents in RFID (Radio Frequency Identification) and customers include 75 percent of Fortune 500 companies and 60 percent of Fortune 100 companies. Intermec was traded on the New York Stock Exchange.

On December 10, 2012, Intermec announced it agreed to be acquired by Honeywell International Inc. in an all-cash transaction valued at approximately $600 million. The Merger was approved by Intermec’s stockholders on March 19, 2013 and received regulatory approval from the European Commission on June 14, 2013. FTC clearance was announced on September 13, 2013.

On September 17, 2013, Honeywell announced the completion of the acquisition of Intermec. Intermec will be integrated with Honeywell Scanning & Mobility, within the Honeywell Automation and Control Solutions (ACS) business.

Products 
The majority of Intermec's business comes from automating supply chain operations in manufacturing, warehouse and distribution, retail, transportation and logistics, direct store delivery and field service sectors. Their product lines include:
 RFID (Radio Frequency Identification) readers, printers, tags and labels 
 Barcode scanners, Barcode printers and Media
 Mobile computers
 Wireless networks
 Software Tools and Utilities
 Voice recognition hardware systems and software
 Lifecycle Services

Corporate timeline 
1966 – Interface Mechanisms formed
1982 – Company renamed Intermec Corporation
1991 – Acquired by Litton Industries, Inc. (NYSE:LIT)
1994 – Ownership transferred to Western Atlas Inc. (NYSE:WAI), a Litton spin-off
1997 – Ownership transferred to UNOVA, Inc. (NYSE:UNA), a Western Atlas spin-off
1997 – Acquired Norand and UBI (United Barcode Industries)
1997 – Acquired radio frequency identification (RFID) semiconductor technology from IBM, Inc.
1998 – Acquired Amtech Corporation's high-frequency RFID business, Amtech Transportation Systems
2006 – UNOVA, Inc. becomes Intermec, Inc., retaining Intermec Technologies as subsidiary
2011 - Acquired private voice technology company Vocollect Inc. and life cycle services company Enterprise Mobile
2013 - Acquired by Honeywell, now part of Honeywell Scanning and Mobility

References

External links
 Honeywell Scanning & Mobility new corporate web site

Electronics companies of the United States
Automatic identification and data capture
Radio-frequency identification companies
Manufacturing companies based in Washington (state)
Companies based in Everett, Washington
Electronics companies established in 1966
1966 establishments in Washington (state)
Companies formerly listed on the New York Stock Exchange
Honeywell
2013 mergers and acquisitions